The Veneration of the Tree of Life is a Manichaean fresco in Cave 38 (Krenweidell No. 25) of the Bezeklik Caves in Turpan, Xinjiang, China, that depicts a Manichae tree of life worship scene. According to the teachings of this religion, there is a tree of life growing in the Kingdom of Light. It has three trunks, which symbolize the East, West, and North of the Kingdom of Light.

Overview 

This fresco was discovered in the early 20th century and was already badly damaged. In order to facilitate research, the German archaeologist Albert Grünwedel drew a black-and-white line sketch, followed by the French archaeologist Joseph Hackin copied color pictures. 

The center of the picture depicts a tree of life with three trunks. The tree has luxuriant branches and leaves, fragrant flowers in full bloom, and numerous fruits. There are huge bunches of grapes hanging down from the branches. The whole tree looks like a huge canopy. The pool under the tree may be the Qibao Incense Pond, with two birds in the pool looking at the worshiping crowd. On the left and right sides of the trunk, there were six people saluting the tree of life. Four of them were kneeling in the front and two standing in the back. They are well-dressed and wear richly decorated high crowns. Among them are angels with wings, believers, and other gods. The angel's name, praise, and vows are Uighur, written in the pool and in the sidebar under the painting. 

Below the incense pond, there is a Uyghur script written in Uighur letters in vertical lines, similar to the prayers: "This is a gathering of the patron saints", "I, Savit, in front of the peacock portrait, write all this, I hope not There is no more sin, I hope [...] be protected", "Otukan Ingesakank (and) Quartluk Tan Misu Kea, I hope they are protected [...] I humbly finish After all this [...] I wish to have peace. Please forgive me for my sins.” Although some of the contents of the prayers involve frescoes, these words are not left by the original author.

See also 
 Sogdian-language Manichaean letter

References 

Manichaean art of East Central Asia
Turpan
Murals
Culture in Xinjiang